Ahmad Smour (born 12 January 1993) is a Jordanian long-distance runner.

In 2017, he competed in the senior men's race at the 2017 IAAF World Cross Country Championships held in Kampala, Uganda. He finished in 97th place. In 2017, he also competed in the men's 3000 metres event at the 2017 Asian Indoor and Martial Arts Games held in Ashgabat, Turkmenistan. He was disqualified in the final after infringement of the inside border.

In 2018, he competed in the men's half marathon at the 2018 IAAF World Half Marathon Championships held in Valencia, Spain. He finished in 126th place.

References

External links 
 

Living people
1993 births
Place of birth missing (living people)
Jordanian male long-distance runners
Jordanian male cross country runners